The Algerian Championnat National 2 season 2008–09 is the fifteenth season of the league under its current title and seventeenth season under its current league division format. It started on 21 August 2008.

League table
A total of 17 teams contested the division, including 14 sides remaining in the division from the previous season and three relegated from the Algerian Championnat National, and one promoted from the Inter-Régions Ligue.

References

Algerian Ligue 2 seasons
2
Algeria